Will Oakland (January 15, 1880–May 15, 1956) was an American countertenor famed for his exceptionally high vocal range. He was born Herman Hinrichs in Jersey City, New Jersey, to German-American immigrant parents.

Oakland began his musical career after leaving the United States Army in 1905, joining Lew Dockstader's minstrels in Rochester, New York. He began recording for Edison Records in 1908, soon after Richard Jose's retirement. In addition to appearing as a solo performer, Oakland recorded duets with Billy Murray, sometimes singing the female part in love songs. He often sang woeful, sentimental songs that contrasted with Murray's usually upbeat repertoire.

From 1912 to 1914 Oakland recorded in the Heidelberg Quintet, joining the members of the American Quartet.

He recorded the song "As I sat upon my dear old mother's knee" by Joseph P. Skelly.

References

External links
 
Collected Works of Will Oakland
Collected Works of Billy Murray and Will Oakland
Collected Works of Heidelberg Quintet with Billy Murray
"In the Gloaming" The American Quartet with Will Oakland (1910)
"Just Before the Battle, Mother", Will Oakland and Chorus (1912)
 Will Oakland recordings at the Discography of American Historical Recordings.
Will Oakland cylinder recordings, from the UCSB Cylinder Audio Archive at the University of California, Santa Barbara Library.

1880 births
1956 deaths
American tenors
American male pop singers
Blackface minstrel performers
American people of German descent
Musicians from Jersey City, New Jersey
Vaudeville performers
20th-century American singers
20th-century American male singers